"I Didn't Mean It" is a song by British rock band Status Quo, released in July 1994. It was included on the album Thirsty Work.

Track listings 
Cassette and 7-inch blue vinyl
 "I Didn't Mean It" (J David) (3.21)
 "Whatever You Want" (Parfitt/Bown) (4:03)

CD1
 "I Didn't Mean It" (J David) (3.21)
 "Whatever You Want" (Parfitt/Bown) (4:03) - Down Down (Rossi/Young) (3:50)
 "Rockin' All Over The World" (J Fogerty) (3:38)

CD2
 "I Didn't Mean It" (Acoustic Version) (J David) (4.01)
 "I Didn't Mean It" (Hooligan Version) (J David) (3.55)
 "Survival" (Rossi/Bown) (3.24)
 "She Knew Too Much" (Rossi/Bown) (3.45)

Charts

References 

Status Quo (band) songs
1994 singles
1994 songs
Polydor Records singles
Songs written by John David (musician)